BWT may refer to 

 the Burrows–Wheeler transform, an algorithm used in file compression 
 BWT, an Austrian wastewater company
 Bridgwater railway station, station code
 Bob Willis Trophy, English cricket competition
 Burnie Airport, IATA airport code "BWT"

See also
 .bwt files, produced by BlindWrite